Bray (born Brayden Gurnari October 17, 1972), is an American musician and singer-songwriter, whose work incorporates rock, pop, and electro funk.

Making his debut as early as 2003, he has released eight studio albums and one live album. He is known for his theatrical and somewhat comedic performance style.

Early life and education
Bray was born in Vallejo, California. He showed interest in art, music and performance as early as age 7, putting on neighborhood concerts using guitars made out of cardboard boxes. Through encouragement from his parents, young Brayden began singing the songs, rather than lip syncing, and was soon on his way toward becoming a promising young singer and performer.

Artists most commonly recognized as influences include Prince, David Bowie and Michael Jackson. In an interview with Rockwired magazine, Bray also listed Bono from U2 and Radiohead as influences on his singing, songwriting and performance approach.

Bray attended De La Salle High School in Concord, California. He received a BA in Graphic Design from San Francisco State University in 1996.

Career Beginnings, European Tours 
Bray began writing songs in high school, inspired by the Oakland funk scene.

In 2003, he released his first full length album, Independent Film. That same year, Bray saw further career growth after being asked to sing at an inauguration party for Arnold Schwarzenegger, who was campaigning to become governor of California.

In 2004, he was named runner up in a global online Song of the Year competition.

In 2005, he was featured on the soundtrack of a San Francisco International LGBT Film Festival documentary, Blood, Sweat and Glitter. This was followed by his first international tour, which took place in France. Returning to the US, he and his band played for more than 50,000 people during the 2005 San Francisco Pride parade, opening for En Vogue.

In 2006, he performed at the "All-Star Tribute to San Francisco Music, Past and Future" at the Warfield Theatre, in San Francisco, California, alongside members of the Sex Pistols, The Doors, and Guns N' Roses.  On July the 1st, Bray returned to France and performed at the Festival des Musiques d'ici et d'ailleurs in Chalons en Champagne for an audience of 7,000.

His second album, Pins and Needles, was released in 2007. Two songs from the album, "Cocoon" and "Piece o' Cake", were used in the reality-television series Bad Girls Club.

In 2008, Bray released the album Live in Germany, recorded at a concert in Schmölln, Germany.
 
1n 2009, he released the album , produced by Gary St. Clair. St. Clair’s credits include production and songwriting for vocal group All 4 One. Prince and the Revolution keyboardist Dr. Fink performs on the album as well.

In 2010, Bray was voted one of the top 100 unsigned artists in the nation by Music Connection magazine. That same year, Bray made his debut at the Castro Street Fair in San Francisco.

In 2012, his video Long Gone reached over two million views on YouTube.

In 2013, his video, “Clone Me” reached more than one million views on YouTube.

Shift to Theater Acting 
In April 2017, Bray produced and played the part of Lloyd Christmas in a stage adaptation of the “Dumb and Dumber.”

Return to Music, Touring, SPC Show 
On October 5, 2018, Bray released his first album in five years, entitled “The Aliens Are Here.” 

In 2018 and 2019, he resumed touring in Europe (now under the name Bray & The Dens), culminating in a performance at the Noorderlicht Festival in Holland on Tuesday Nov 26, 2019.

In 2020, Bray released the album “Stingray” with a streaming online performance, including costume changes and song commentary. This was followed by the single and video for “Wicked Game (Desert Mix,” a remake of Chris Isaak’s original, with Bray’s version featuring a string quartet.

On Christmas day, 2020, Bray introduced a new project, indie punk duo Moth Tax, with the release of the EP, “Untitled,” along with a video for each of the four songs.

Following a private streaming concert meant to connect with fans at the beginning of the COVID-19 pandemic, he began producing a music and comedy variety series, “The SPC Show,” featuring recurring weekly episodes.

Discography

Albums
Independent Film (2003)
Pins and Needles (2007)
Live in Germany (2008)
 (2009)
The End Is The Beginning (2012)
The Aliens Are Here (2018)
Stingray (2020)

Singles
"Dracula" (2007)
“Wicked Game (Desert Mix)” (2020)
“Sensational” (2021)

See also

 List of people from California
 List of singer-songwriters
 Music of California

References

External links 
  - official website
 

1972 births
20th-century American singers
American electro musicians
American funk bass guitarists
American male bass guitarists
American male singer-songwriters
American pop guitarists
American rock bass guitarists
American rock singers
American rock songwriters
Living people
Musicians from Vallejo, California
Singer-songwriters from California
American male pop singers
20th-century American bass guitarists
21st-century American bass guitarists
Guitarists from California
20th-century American male singers
21st-century American male singers
21st-century American singers